Tahir Naqqash (born June 6, 1959, Lahore, Punjab) is a former Pakistani cricketer from Kashmir who played in 15 Tests and 40 ODIs from 1980 to 1985.He played under the captaincy of Imran khan. 

1959 births
Living people
Tahir Naqqash
Tahir Naqqash
Cricketers at the 1983 Cricket World Cup
Pakistani cricketers
Service Industries cricketers
Lahore A cricketers
Lahore City cricketers
Muslim Commercial Bank cricketers